Vladimir Nikolayevich Medvedev (born 10 July 1971) is a former Russian football player.

References

1971 births
Living people
Soviet footballers
Russian footballers
Association football midfielders
Russian expatriate footballers
Expatriate footballers in Belarus
Russian Premier League players
FC Starye Dorogi players
FC Zhemchuzhina Sochi players
FC Armavir players
FC Novokuznetsk players
FC Amur Blagoveshchensk players